A message is an object of communication.

Message or Messages may also refer to

Arts, entertainment, and media

Music

Groups and labels
 Message (band), an American hard rock band

Albums 
 Message (AIDES album) (2010)
 Messages  (Mongol800 album) (2001)
 Messages: Greatest Hits, a compilation album by Orchestral Manoeuvres in the Dark
 Messages (album), a 1974 album by Steve Swindells
 Message (Aya Ueto album) (2004)
 Sakura Gakuin 2010 Nendo: Message, a 2011 album by Sakura Gakuin

Songs
 "Message" (Boris song) (2008)
 "Message" (Masaharu Fukuyama song) (1995)
 "Message" (Myname song) (2011)
 "Messages" (Orchestral Manoeuvres in the Dark song) (1980)
 "Messages" (San Cisco song), a 2020 song by San Cisco
 "Message"/"Personal", a single by Aya Ueto from Message
 "Message" (Vivid song)
 "Message", a song by Sakura Gakuin from Sakura Gakuin 2010 Nendo: Message
 "Messages", a song by A Flock of Seagulls from A Flock of Seagulls
 "Messages", a song by Filthy Dukes from Nonsense in the Dark
 "Messages", a song by Velvet Revolver from Libertad

Other uses in arts, entertainment, and media
 Message, a Seventh-day Adventist periodical
 Messages (film), a 2007 British film
 The Message, a 1976 film based on the life of Islamic Prophet Muhammad

Other uses
 Messages (Apple), a messaging app by Apple
 Messages (Google), a messaging app by Google

See also
 "Message / Call My Name", a 2013 BoA song
 Message passing
 The Message (disambiguation)